Detective Comics is an American comic book series published by Detective Comics, later shortened to DC Comics. The first volume, published from 1937 to 2011 (and later continued in 2016), is best known for introducing the superhero Batman in Detective Comics #27 (cover-dated May 1939).

A second series of the same title was launched in September 2011, but in 2016, reverted to the original volume numbering. The series is the source of its publishing company's name, and—along with Action Comics, the series that launched with the debut of Superman—one of the medium's signature series. Between 1937 and 2011, there were 881 issues of the series. It is the longest-running comic book series in the United States.

Publication history

Detective Comics was the final publication of the entrepreneur Major Malcolm Wheeler-Nicholson, whose comics company, National Allied Publications, would evolve into DC Comics, one of the world's two largest comic book publishers, though long after its founder had left it. Wheeler-Nicholson's first two titles were the landmark New Fun: The Big Comic-Magazine #1 (cover-dated Feb. 1935), colloquially called New Fun Comics #1 and the first such early comic book to contain all-original content, rather than a mix of newspaper comic strips and comic-strip-style new material. His second effort, New Comics #1, would be retitled twice to become Adventure Comics, another seminal series that ran for decades until issue #503 in 1983, and was later revived in 2009.

The third and final title published under his aegis would be Detective Comics, advertised with a cover illustration dated December 1936, but eventually premiering three months later, with a March 1937 cover date.  Wheeler-Nicholson was in debt to printing-plant owner and magazine distributor Harry Donenfeld, who was, as well, a pulp-magazine publisher and a principal in the magazine distributorship Independent News. Wheeler-Nicholson took Donenfeld on as a partner in order to publish Detective Comics #1 through the newly formed Detective Comics, Inc., with Wheeler-Nicholson and Jack S. Liebowitz, Donenfeld's accountant, listed as owners. Wheeler-Nicholson was forced out a year later.

Originally an anthology comic, in the manner of the times, Detective Comics #1 (March 1937) featured stories in the "hard-boiled detective" genre, with such stars as Ching Lung (a Fu Manchu-style "Yellow Peril" villain); Slam Bradley (created by Jerry Siegel and Joe Shuster before their character Superman saw print two years later); and Speed Saunders, among others. Its first editor, Vin Sullivan, also drew the debut issue's cover.  The Crimson Avenger debuted in issue #20 (October 1938).

Early issues of the series have been criticized for their racism and xenophobia.

Batman / Bruce Wayne

Detective Comics #27 (March 1939 with a printed date of May 1939) marked the first appearance of Batman. This superhero would eventually become the star of the title, the cover logo of which is often written as "Detective Comics featuring Batman". Because of its significance, issue #27 is widely considered one of the most valuable comic books in existence, with one copy selling for $1,075,000 in a February 2010 auction.

Batman's origin is first revealed in a two-page story in issue #33 (Nov. 1939). Batman became the main cover feature of the title beginning with issue #35 (Jan. 1940). Issue #38 (April 1940) introduced Batman's sidekick Robin, billed as "The Sensational Character Find of 1940" on the cover and the first of several characters that would make up the "Batman Family." Robin's appearance and the subsequent increase in sales of the book soon led to the trend of superheroes and young sidekicks that characterize the era that fans and historians call the "Golden Age of Comic Books." Several of Batman's best known villains debuted in the pages of Detective Comics during this era, including the Penguin in issue #58, Two-Face in issue #66, and the Riddler in issue #140.

Batwoman first appeared in Detective Comics #233 (July 1956). Since the family formula had proven very successful for the Superman franchise, editor Jack Schiff suggested to Batman co-creator Bob Kane that he create one for the Batman. A female was chosen first, to offset the charges made by Fredric Wertham that Batman and Robin were homosexual. Writer Bill Finger and artist Sheldon Moldoff introduced Bat-Mite in issue #267 (May 1959) and Clayface in #298 (Dec. 1961).

In 1964, Julius Schwartz was made responsible for reviving the fading Batman titles. Writer John Broome and artist Carmine Infantino jettisoned the sillier aspects that had crept into the franchise, such as Ace the Bathound and Bat-Mite and gave the character a "New Look" that premiered in Detective Comics #327 (May 1964). Schwartz, Gardner Fox, and Infantino introduced, from the William Dozier produced TV series, Barbara Gordon as a new version of Batgirl in a story titled "The Million Dollar Debut of Batgirl!" in issue #359 (Jan. 1967). Mike Friedrich wrote the 30th anniversary Batman story in Detective Comics #387 (May 1969) which was drawn by Bob Brown.

Writer Dennis O'Neil and artist Neal Adams had their first collaboration on Batman on the story  "The Secret of the Waiting Graves" in issue #395 (Jan. 1970).  The duo, under the direction of Schwartz, would revitalize the character with a series of noteworthy stories reestablishing Batman's dark, brooding nature and taking the books away from the campy look and feel of the 1966–68 ABC TV series. Comics historian Les Daniels observed that "O'Neil's interpretation of Batman as a vengeful obsessive-compulsive, which he modestly describes as a return to the roots, was actually an act of creative imagination that has influenced every subsequent version of the Dark Knight." Adams introduced the Man-Bat with writer Frank Robbins in Detective Comics #400 (June 1970). O'Neil and artist Bob Brown crafted Batman's first encounter with the League of Assassins in Detective Comics #405 (Nov. 1970) and created Talia al Ghul in issue #411 (May 1971).

After publishing on a monthly schedule throughout its run, Detective Comics became a bi-monthly book from issues #435 (June–July 1973) to #445 (Feb.-March 1975). Issues #438 (Dec. 1973-Jan. 1974) to #445 (Feb.–March 1975) of the series were in the 100 Page Super Spectacular format. O'Neil and artist Dick Giordano created the Batman supporting character Leslie Thompkins in the story "There Is No Hope in Crime Alley" appearing in issue #457 (March 1976). Writer Steve Englehart and artist Marshall Rogers produced an acclaimed run of Batman stories in Detective Comics #471–476 (Aug. 1977 – April 1978), and provided one of the definitive interpretations that influenced the 1989 Batman film and would be adapted for the 1990s animated series. The Englehart and Rogers pairing, was described in 2009 by comics writer and historian Robert Greenberger as "one of the greatest" creative teams to work on the Batman character. In their story "The Laughing Fish", the Joker is brazen enough to disfigure fish with a rictus grin, then expects to be granted a federal trademark on them, only to start killing the bureaucrats who try to explain to him that obtaining such a claim on a natural resource is legally impossible. 
Writer Len Wein and Rogers co-created the third version of the supervillain Clayface in Detective Comics #478 (July–Aug. 1978). From issue #481 (Dec. 1978 – Jan. 1979) through #495 (Oct. 1980), the magazine adopted the expanded Dollar Comics format used by the canceled Batman Family, adding solo features including "Robin: the Teen Wonder", "Batgirl", the "Human Target" and the anthology "Tales of Gotham City", which featured stories of the city's ordinary people. Julius Schwartz, who had edited the title for most of its run since 1964, left the series as of issue #484 (June–July 1979) The original Katherine Kane also known as "Batwoman" was killed in the lead story in issue #485 (Aug.–Sept. 1979) by the League of Assassins.
    
The title's 500th issue (March 1981) featured stories by several well-known creators including television writer Alan Brennert and Walter B. Gibson best known for his work on the pulp fiction character The Shadow. Also used during the 1980s was the use of serialization of the main Batman story, with stories from Detective Comics and Batman directly flowing from one book to another, with cliffhangers at the end of each book's monthly story that would be resolved in the other title of that month. A single writer handled both books during that time beginning with Gerry Conway and followed up by Doug Moench. The supervillain Killer Croc made a shadowy cameo in issue #523 (Feb. 1983). Noted author Harlan Ellison wrote the Batman story in issue #567.

Writer Mike W. Barr and artists Alan Davis and Todd McFarlane crafted the "Batman: Year Two" storyline in Detective Comics #575–578 which followed up on Frank Miller's "Batman: Year One". Writer Alan Grant and artist Norm Breyfogle introduced the Ventriloquist in their first Batman story together and the Ratcatcher in their third (#585). Sam Hamm, who wrote the screenplay for Tim Burton's Batman,  wrote the "Blind Justice" story in Detective Comics issues #598–600. Chuck Dixon became the writer of the series with issue #644 (May 1992). He and Tom Lyle co-created the Electrocutioner in Detective Comics #644 (May 1992) and Stephanie Brown in Detective Comics #647 (August 1992).

The "Batman: Legacy" storyline began in issue #700 (August 1996).  The "No Man's Land" storyline crossed over into Detective Comics in issues #730–741. Writer Greg Rucka and artist Shawn Martinbrough became the creative team as of issue #742 (March 2000) and created the Sasha Bordeaux character in issue #751 (Dec. 2000). Issue #800 (Jan. 2005) was written by Andersen Gabrych and drawn by Pete Woods. Paul Dini became the writer of the series as of issue #821 (Sept. 2006) and created a new version of the Ventriloquist in #827 (March 2007). Scott Snyder became the writer of Detective Comics with issue #871 (Jan. 2011).

Back-up features
In addition to the Batman stories, the title has had numerous back-up strips. The Boy Commandos by Joe Simon and Jack Kirby debuted in Detective Comics #64 (June 1942) and were then soon spun off into their own title.  The character Roy Raymond first appeared in issue #153 (Nov. 1949). The Martian Manhunter was created by writer Joseph Samachson and artist Joe Certa in the back-up story "The Strange Experiment of Dr. Erdel" in Detective Comics #225 (Nov. 1955). After issue #326 (April 1964), the Martian Manhunter was moved to House of Mystery and in issue #327 the Elongated Man and his wife, now remodeled after Dashiell Hammett's Nick and Nora Charles, took over. The characters crossed over with Batman three times. The Elongated Man run lasted until issue #383 (Jan. 1969) and his feature returned sporadically 15 times until issue #572, which celebrated the 50th anniversary of the title by teaming him up with Batman, Robin, Slam Bradley and Sherlock Holmes against Edgar Moriarty, the great-grandnephew of Professor Moriarty. After the Elongated Man back-up feature ended, Batgirl held the role until issue #424. She returned from issues 481-519 after being moved to Batman Family. Jason Bard appeared as the backup feature in the odd-numbered issues of Detective from #425-435. The Manhunter was resurrected in a story by Archie Goodwin and Walt Simonson in issue #437 (Oct.-Nov. 1973). With the last episode of the series, Manhunter moved to the front of the book in a full-length team-up with Batman. The Green Arrow became the back-up feature starting with issue #521 (Dec. 1982) and running until #567 (Oct. 1986). The Black Canary received a new costume in the back-up story in issue #554 (Sept. 1985). DC Comics Bonus Books were included in issues #589 (August 1988) and 595 (Jan. 1989).

After a lengthy absence, the backup features returned for issues #746–810.  These were more closed-ended stories featuring new and established characters in the Batman mythos.  The first was "The Jacobian" in issues #746–757, followed by a one-issue Batman story in #758.  The following issues, #759–762, featured Slam Bradley and were a lead-in to the 2002 Catwoman series.  Issues #763–772 featured Josephine "Josie Mac" MacDonald, a Gotham police detective.  Issues #773–775 were titled "Tales of Gotham" and feature Detectives Crispus Allen and Renee Montoya.  Batman starred in "Spore" from issues #776–780.  #781 featured a special Elseworlds tale, while #782 featured a Batman solo tale. Issue #783 featured a prelude to the "Death and the Maidens" miniseries ,and issue #784 featured a Josie Mac tale.  The "Tales of Gotham" stories resumed in issues #785–788 with "The Dogcatcher", and #789–794 featured "The Tailor". "Polished Stone", featuring the Green Arrow and Onyx, ran in issues #795–796. "Low", featuring the Riddler and Poison Ivy, ran from issues #797–799. Under the title "Tales of Gotham," Detective Comics #800 had a short Batman back-up story. A four-issue (#801–805) story featuring the Barker entitled "When You're Strange" was next and "Mud" in issue #805. The last back-up was a three-issue (#808–810) story about Killer Croc. It came after a two-issue (#806–807) story about Alfred.

The "Manhunter" series that ran as a backup in Detective Comics from 1973 to 1974 won the Shazam Award for "Best Individual Short Story (Dramatic)" in 1974 for the story "Cathedral Perilous" in issue #441, written by Archie Goodwin and Walt Simonson.

Batwoman

In 2009, as part of a planned reorganization of the Batman universe due to the events shown in Batman R.I.P. and Final Crisis, Detective Comics went on hiatus for three months while DC Comics published the Battle for the Cowl miniseries. Upon its return, the series featured the newly reintroduced (in 52) Batwoman as the new star of the book, as well as a 10-page back-up feature starring Renee Montoya as the new Question. The series returned Batman to a starring role in early 2010.

The New 52
DC Comics relaunched Detective Comics with issue #1 in September 2011, as part of an initiative called The New 52. The series was written and drawn by Tony Daniel until the 12th issue, with the team of John Layman and Jason Fabok beginning with issue #13.

The first issue of the relaunched Detective Comics has received six printings, second only to the relaunched Justice League which had seven printings. The series' 7th issue was also DC Comic's 6th highest selling digital comic, ranking above many other series in the Batman category. Scott West of Sciencefiction.com gave the series' third arc a positive review, stating that "After last month's disappointing ‘Night of the Owls’ tie-in issue, it's nice to see ‘Detective Comics’ getting back to where it should be...good detective stories." The relaunched Detective Comics received the award for "Best Series" at the 2012 Stan Lee Awards. The series' first collected edition would reach the number 1 spot on The New York Times Best Seller list in the category of "Hardcover Graphic Books".

Daniel wrote and penciled the series until the Night of the Owls crossover, at which point Ed Benes, Julio Ferreira, and Eduardo Pansica began drawing the series for a three-issue arc. The price of Detective Comics was increased due to the addition of a backup feature starring Batman villain Two-Face, which was written by Daniel and illustrated by Syzmon Kudranski, this followed a similar backup featuring Professor Hugo Strange. Daniel left the series with issue #12 being his last as writer and the "0" issue his last as penciller.

DC celebrated the first anniversary of The New 52 in September 2012 by publishing a number "0" of each original New 52 title which act as prequels to the series and reveal previously unexplained plot elements. Gregg Hurwitz wrote the "0" issue. Hurwitz was approached by Daniel to write the "0" issue due to Daniel's busy schedule. To follow up on the Night of the Owls elements in Detective Comics, Daniel wrote Detective Comics Annual #1, which was pencilled by Romano Molenaar and inked by Sandu Florea.

Following Daniel's tenure on the series, John Layman became the new writer and Jason Fabok the new artist with James Tynion IV writing the backup features and Syzmon Kudranski remaining as artist for Tynion's first feature. With issue #19 of Detective Comics vol. 2, released on April 3, 2013, the series reached 900 issues as combined with the first volume of the series, and was a special oversized celebratory issue. Under Layman, the series featured its first crossover, Gothtopia after which Layman and Fabok moved to the Batman Eternal series and Detective Comics was taken over by Brain Buccalleto and Francis Manapul.

In commemoration of the second anniversary of The New 52, DC Comics announced "Villains Month" with Detective Comics getting four issues. The issues starred Poison Ivy, Harley Quinn, the Scarecrow, and the Man-Bat, and, respectively, being numbered #23.1, #23.2, #23.3, and #23.4, by an ensemble of writers and artists.

For the 75th anniversary of Batman, issue #27 was a larger-sized issue featuring new stories by Brad Meltzer and Bryan Hitch, Scott Snyder and Sean Murphy, Peter Tomasi and Ian Bertram, John Layman and Jason Fabok, Gregg Hurwitz and Neal Adams, Mike W. Barr and Guillem March, and one written and drawn by Francesco Francavilla. In addition, variant covers to the issue were by Greg Capullo, Frank Miller, Chris Burnham, Jim Lee, Jason Fabok, and Tony Daniel. Single page artwork included work by Kelley Jones, Mike Allred, Patrick Gleason, and Jock.

2016 – present

In February 2016, DC Comics announced that as part of the company's continuity relaunch called DC Rebirth, Detective Comics would resume its original numbering system with June 2016's issue #934. The 52 issues of Detective Comics volume 2 (2011-2016) were added to the original count of 881 issues from Detective Comics volume 1 (1937-2011), making Detective Comics #934 the premier issue following the end of the DC Rebirth initiative. The series was published twice-monthly.

The creative team beginning with issue #934 included writer James Tynion IV and artists Eddy Barrows and Alvaro Martinez. The series featured a team led by Batman and Batwoman (Kate Kane), operating out of a secondary base in the heart of Gotham known as the Belfry. Team members initially included Red Robin (Tim Drake), Spoiler (Stephanie Brown), Orphan (Cassandra Cain) and Clayface (Basil Karlo), with Batwing (Luke Fox) and Azrael (Jean-Paul Valley) later recruited as new members. Zatanna also briefly joins the team as a guest star in several issues. This status quo ended with the conclusion of Tynion's run on the series in issue #981, published May 2018. During the interim period without a permanent writer, Bryan Edward Hill wrote the story arc "On the Outside" starring Batman, Orphan, Signal, Katana and Black Lightning over issues #983-987 as a prelude to his ongoing series Batman and the Outsiders. The next regular writer, Peter Tomasi, began on the series with issue #994, published December 2018. Tomasi's run as writer continued for two years until issue #1033, published December 2020.

On March 27, 2019, DC Comics released the series' 1,000th issue, marking the second American comic book in history to reach that milestone after Action Comics in 2018. The issue, which coincided with Batman's 80th anniversary, is an anthology featuring several stories from a variety of different creative teams.

Writer Mariko Tamaki began on the series with issue #1034 as part of the Infinite Frontier line-wide relaunch. In April 2022, it was announced that Ram V and Rafael Albuquerque would serve as the new creative team starting with issue #1062.

Significant issues

First appearances

Notes

Collected editions

Volume 1 (1937-2011)
The Detective Comics series has been collected into a number of trade paperbacks and hardback collections.

Batman Archive editions
All DC Archive Editions are hardback only and printed on high quality archival paper.

Batman Chronicles
The Batman Chronicles series plans to reprint every Batman adventure in color, in chronological order, in affordable trade paperbacks. It is not to be confused with the now-finished series of the same name.

Showcase Presents
All Showcase Presents collections are large (over 500 pages), softcover, black and white only reprints.

Celebration hardcovers
Starting in 2014, DC began releasing character retrospective anthologies, several of which feature issues of Detective Comics

Tales of The Batman/Legends of the Dark Knight
These hardcover books reprint issues by particular creators and contain many issues of Detective Comics, as well as other Batman titles.

Other editions
Many of these other editions are anthologies containing comics from titles other than Detective Comics.  Titles here are presented as close to chronologically as possible.

The New 52

The New 52 saw every DC Comics series collected in its entirety in trade paperback form. Notably, collected volumes of Detective Comics vol. 2 were published in hardcover editions first, with paperback editions being delayed until the release of the next hardcover volume.

Material from Detective Comics vol. 2 was also included in several collections of crossover events, each printed in both hardcover and softcover. In each case, the material consisted of tie-ins to the main event.

DC Rebirth to present

Volumes 1-5 were published with DC Rebirth trade dress on the cover. This was dropped from volume 6 onwards, coinciding with the end of "DC Rebirth" branding on the series from issue #970 onwards.

Numbering on the collected editions was restarted from volume 1 with the start of Peter Tomasi's run as writer in issue #994. The first three volumes were published in hardcover editions first, before being reprinted in paperback.

Millennium Editions
In 2000 and 2001, DC reprinted several of its most notable issues in the Millennium Edition series.  Seven issues of Detective Comics were reprinted in this format.

References

Further reading

External links
Detective Comics at DC Comics official site
Detective Comics at the Grand Comics Database

1937 comics debuts
2011 comics endings
2011 comics debuts
Comics magazines published in the United States
DC Comics imprints
DC Comics titles
Comics anthologies
Comics by Alan Grant (writer)
Comics by Archie Goodwin (comics)
Comics by Dennis O'Neil
Comics by Doug Moench
Comics by Ed Brubaker
Comics by Gardner Fox
Comics by Greg Rucka
Comics by Len Wein
Comics by Michael Fleisher
Comics by Neal Adams
Comics by Paul Dini
Comics by Paul Kupperberg
Comics by Peter J. Tomasi
Comics by Steve Englehart
Comics by Walt Simonson
Golden Age comics titles
Magazines established in 1937
Magazines disestablished in 2011
Magazines established in 2011